Ernst Gebendinger (10 February 1926 – 23 May 2017) was a Swiss gymnast. At the 1950 World Artistic Gymnastics Championships in Basel he won three gold medals: In Floor exercise (together with Joseph Stalder), Vault and with the Swiss team. He competed in the 1952 Summer Olympics. After an accident 1954 he had to end his career.

References

1926 births
2017 deaths
Swiss male artistic gymnasts
Olympic gymnasts of Switzerland
Gymnasts at the 1952 Summer Olympics
Olympic silver medalists for Switzerland
Olympic medalists in gymnastics
Medalists at the 1952 Summer Olympics
People from Winterthur
Sportspeople from the canton of Zürich
20th-century Swiss people